Civil liberties in the United States are certain unalienable rights retained by (as opposed to privileges granted to) citizens of the United States under the Constitution of the United States, as interpreted and clarified by the Supreme Court of the United States and lower federal courts. Civil liberties are simply defined as individual legal and constitutional protections from entities more powerful than an individual, for example, parts of the government, other individuals, or corporations. The explicitly defined liberties make up the Bill of Rights, including freedom of speech, the right to bear arms, and the right to privacy. There are also many liberties of people not defined in the Constitution, as stated in the Ninth Amendment: The enumeration in the Constitution, of certain rights, shall not be construed to deny or disparage others retained by the people.

The extent of civil liberties and the percentage of the population of the United States who had access to these liberties has expanded over time. For example, the Constitution did not originally define who was eligible to vote, allowing each state to determine who was eligible. In the early history of the U.S., most states allowed only white male adult property owners to vote (about 6% of the population). The 'Three-Fifths Compromise' allowed the southern slaveholders to consolidate power and maintain slavery in America for eighty years after the ratification of the Constitution. And the Bill of Rights had little impact on judgements by the courts for the first 130 years after ratification.

United States Constitution

Freedom of religion

The text of Amendment I to the United States Constitution, ratified December 15, 1791, states that:

Freedom of expression

Free Speech Clause

The text of Amendment I to the United States Constitution, ratified December 15, 1791, states that:

Free Press Clause

The text of Amendment I to the United States Constitution, ratified December 15, 1791, states that:

Free Assembly Clause

The text of Amendment I to the United States Constitution, ratified December 15, 1791, states that:

Petition Clause

The text of Amendment I to the United States Constitution, ratified December 15, 1791, states that:

Free speech exceptions

The following types of speech are not protected constitutionally: defamation or false statements, child pornography, obscenity, damaging the national security interests, verbal acts, and fighting words. Because these categories fall outside of the First Amendment privileges, the courts can legally restrict or criminalize any expressive act within them. Other expressions, including threat of bodily harm or publicizing illegal activity, may also be ruled illegal.

Right to keep and bear arms

The text of Amendment II to the United States Constitution, ratified December 15, 1791, states that:

Sexual freedom
The concept of sexual freedom includes a broad range of different rights that are not mentioned in the U.S. Constitution. The idea of sexual freedom has sprung more from the popular opinion of society in more recent years, and has had very little Constitutional backing. The following liberties are included under sexual freedom: sexual expression, sexual choices, sexual education, reproductive justice, and sexual health. Sexual freedom in general is considered an implied procedure, and is not mentioned in the Constitution.

Sexual freedoms include the freedom to have consensual sex with whomever a person chooses, at any time, for any reason, provided the person is of the age of majority. Marriage is not required, nor are there any requirements as to the gender or number of people you have sex with. Sexual freedom includes the freedom to have private consensual homosexual sex (Lawrence v. Texas).

Equal protection

Equal protection prevents the government from creating laws that are discriminatory in application or effect.

Right to vote

The text of Amendment XIV to the United States Constitution, ratified July 9, 1868, states that:

The text of Amendment XV to the United States Constitution, ratified February 3, 1870, states that:

The text of Amendment XIX to the United States Constitution, ratified August 18, 1919, states that:

The text of Amendment XXIII to the United States Constitution, ratified January 23, 1964, states that:

The text of Amendment XXVI to the United States Constitution, ratified July 1, 1971, states that:

Right to parent one's children

The right to parent one's own children also includes the right for a parent to teach their children as they see fit, and not have others govern over what their children are taught.

Right to privacy

Right to marriage

In the 1967 United States Supreme Court ruling in the case of Loving v. Virginia found a fundamental right to marriage, regardless of race. In the 2015 United States Supreme Court ruling in the case of Obergefell v. Hodges found a fundamental right to marriage, regardless of gender.

Rights of self-defense

See also
 American Civil Liberties Union
 Civil liberties in the United Kingdom
 Civil rights in the United States
 Constitution of the United States

References

Further reading

 Abbott, Lewis F. Defending Liberty: The Case for a New Bill of Rights ISR Publications 2019. 
 Alexander, Keith L. Lawsuit Seeks Right to Carry Concealed Weapons in the District. Www.washingtonpost.com. The Washington Post, 8 Aug. 2009. Web. 29 Sept. 2009.
 American Civil Liberties Union. ACLU.org. n.d. Web. 27 Sept. 2009.
 FindLaw. First Amendment - Religion and Expression. FindLaw for Legal Professionals. FindLaw, 2009. Web. 29 Sept. 2009.
 Gordon, Jesse. Civil Liberties vs. Civil Rights. OnTheIssues.org. Ed. Jesse Gordon. Jesse Gordon, 3 Aug. 2000. Web. 29 Sept. 2009.
 Scalia, Antonin. District of Columbia v. Heller. Oyez.org. The US Supreme Court Media, June 2008. Web. 29 Sept. 2009.

 
Rights
United States constitutional law